Iidesjärvi is a small lake in Tampere, Finland. It is situated southeast of the center of Tampere. It has a tower built for birdwatchers on its east end.

References

Kokemäenjoki basin
Landforms of Pirkanmaa
Lakes of Tampere